The Westerwaldkreis ("District of Westerwald") is a district (Kreis) in the north-east of Rhineland-Palatinate, Germany. Neighbouring districts are (from north clockwise) Altenkirchen, Lahn-Dill, Limburg-Weilburg, Rhein-Lahn, the district-free city Koblenz, Mayen-Koblenz and Neuwied.

History
When the area became part of Prussia in 1866 two districts covering the area were created. The northern part was covered by the Oberwesterwaldkreis with capital in Marienberg, the Unterwesterwaldkreis with capital in Montabaur covering the southern part. 1886 a third district was added with the Westerburg district with area from both of the other two districts. In 1932 the districts structure was reformed again, the Oberwesterwaldkreis and the Westerburg district were merged to a new Oberwesterwaldkreis with capital in Westerburg. In 1974 in another reform the districts Oberwesterwaldkreis and Unterwesterwaldkreis were merged to form the Westerwaldkreis.

Together with the neighboring Rhein-Lahn district a partnership with the English county Northamptonshire was started in 1981. As part of the partnership of Rhineland-Palatinate with Rwanda the district had a partnership with the municipality Mugesera since 1983. As in 2001 this municipality was included in the district Mirenge the partner changed.

Geography
The district is located in the Westerwald mountains. Its highest elevation is the Fuchskaute, at 657 m, the lowest is near Diez in the valley of the Gelbach, at 150 m.

Coat of arms
The bottom part of the coat of arms show basalt pillars, as the Westerwald is of volcanic origin. There are seven pillars representing the seven Verbandsgemeinden of the district which have basalt or quartzite in their area. The green band in the middle represents the forests, the jug in the upper part the traditional pottery industry in the district.

Towns and municipalities

References

External links

  (German)

 
Districts of Rhineland-Palatinate